Padauk Pinle, also known as Sea of Padauk is a 2003 Burmese musical-drama film, directed by Maung Tin Oo starring Yaza Ne Win, Htun Eaindra Bo, Zaw One, Zarganar, Kutho and Bay Lu Wa.

Cast
Yaza Ne Win
Htun Eaindra Bo
Zaw One
Zarganar
Kutho
Bay Lu Wa
Zaw Win Htut

Release
It was released on 14 March 2003.

References

2003 films
Burmese drama films
2000s musical drama films
2003 drama films
2000s Burmese-language films